State Route 52 (SR 52) is an east–west state highway that crosses eight counties in northern and northeastern Tennessee. The  route originates in Orlinda along SR 49 and ends in Elgin along U.S. Route 27 (US 27).

SR 52 is mostly a primary route, but becomes secondary west of I-65. Between Celina and Livingston it is part of Corridor J of the Appalachian Development Highway System.

Route description

In the border counties
SR 52 begins as a secondary state route in Orlinda at SR 49 in Robertson County. It begins an eastward trek and junctions with I-65 (Exit 117) west of Portland. A short distance later, it junctions with US 31W (SR 41) and enters Sumner County. Once it does so, it becomes a primary route. SR 52 then enters Portland and has an Intersection with SR 109. Continuing east, SR 52 enters Westmoreland, bypassing the downtown area to the south, and comes to an intersection with US 31E/231 (SR 6). It then crosses into Macon County and passes through Siloam. SR 52 continues into Lafayette to intersect with SR 10. It then exits Lafayette and intersects with SR 262 at Webbtown. It continues to Red Boiling Springs, where it has a junction with SR 56. It then has an interchange with SR 151 a short distance later.

It continues eastward into Clay County, and goes through the communities of Hermitage Springs and Moss, the latter of which SR 51 intersects SR 52, and SR 135 intersects SR 52 in the former. SR 53 intersects SR 52 at Celina.

For SR 52’s first , it parallels the Tennessee-Kentucky state line.

Celina to Elgin

After exiting Celina, SR 52 turns southeast to cross into Overton County. A short distance from the county line, it comes to a junction with SR 136 just north of Standing Stone State Park. It continues east and passes through Allons. SR 52 then enters Livingston and intersects with SR 111. It continues into downtown and becomes concurrent with SR 85. It continues east and goes through Alpine and separates from SR 85 to the east.

SR 52 then continues eastward into far southern Pickett County, and then crosses into Fentress County shortly thereafter. It winds to the east to Jamestown, where it has an intersection with SR 154. It then goes straight through downtown, crosses Main St. (Old US 127), and has an interchange with US 127 (SR 28) just outside of town. SR 52 then goes southeast, and enters Allardt to intersect SR 296. It then continues on known as "Rugby Pike", which is the name it keeps all the way to its eastern end. It continues through rural Fentress county to a tall bridge over the Clear Fork River and crosses into Morgan County and the Eastern Time Zone. 

A short distance past the river, SR 52 intersects Rugby Parkway, which until December 2013 was the actual route of SR 52, which runs a loop through the historic community of Rugby, while the current route runs along a new bypass to the south. SR 52 then becomes very narrow and curvy and straddles Morgan County's eastern boundary line for several miles before finally entering Scott County to end in the community of Elgin at an intersection with US 27 (SR 29).

History
Sometime between 2010 and 2013, SR 52 in Red Boiling Springs was rerouted onto a bypass route to the south of that city. Most of the old alignment, however, still retains its SR 56 designation through the town. Several other older alignments of SR 52 still remain in Macon and northern Sumner Counties, including Church Street in Lafayette, and Austin Peay Highway near Westmoreland.

In December 2013, the town of Rugby was bypassed by the rerouting of SR 52, with the old alignment now being known as Rugby Parkway.

SR 52 in eastern Clay County was rerouted onto a straighter alignment from Celina to the Overton County line. After that project was finished in the 2010s, SR 52 no longer runs concurrently with SR 53 on the south side of town. The old alignment is now known as Old Livingston Highway. Parts of an even older alignment of State Route 52 in Clay County still remains intact also.

Major intersections

Related route

State Route 52 Truck Route (SR 52 Truck) is a truck route in downtown Celina, in Clay County.
Dow Avenue from SR 52 (Main St./Dow Ave.) to Brown Street, and
Brown Street from Dow Avenue to Lake Avenue.
The route folds back into SR 52 at the corner of Brown Street and Lake Avenue.

References

 
052
Transportation in Robertson County, Tennessee
Transportation in Sumner County, Tennessee
Transportation in Macon County, Tennessee
Transportation in Clay County, Tennessee
Transportation in Overton County, Tennessee
Transportation in Pickett County, Tennessee
Transportation in Fentress County, Tennessee
Transportation in Morgan County, Tennessee
Transportation in Scott County, Tennessee